Heartstrings ( is a 2016 French comedy-drama film based on the 2012 novel Le Coeur en Braille by Pascal Ruter.

Plot
Marie, a serious student who is passionate about playing the cello, wants to join the conservatory, but is losing her eyesight. She befriends Victor, who falls in love with her and decides to help her succeed, all the while keeping her handicap a secret.

Cast and characters
 Alix Vaillot as Marie
 Jean-Stan DuPac as Victor
 Charles Berling as Marie's father
 Antoine Khorsand as Haicam
 Ilan Levi as Étienne
 Noah Levi as Marcel
 Vincent Taloche as Mr. Azra
 Aude Ruyter as Marie's mother
 Max Garang-Boulègue as Romain
 Laurent Capelluto as Dr. Vergne
 Florence Guérin as Contest host

References

External links
 

2016 films
2016 comedy-drama films
French comedy-drama films
2010s French-language films
2010s French films